Aberdeen Taexali is a rugby union club based in Aberdeen, Scotland.

History

The club was founded in 2018 by Bryan Sinclair and Ross Barr-Hoyland. It is an inclusive club and welcomes anyone regardless of sexual orientation. The club ran its first taster session in November 2018 at Hazlehead Park Playing Fields. In 2019, the club formed a committee and a constitution.

Sides

To become a member of the club you need to be aged 18 or over. You can attend 4 free training sessions before deciding to become a member or not.

The club trains on Wednesday nights from 6.30pm to 8pm at Woodside Sports Complex; and Sundays from 11am to 12.30pm.

Honours

Mens

 Hadrians Cup
 Champions (1): 2020

References

Rugby union in Aberdeen
Scottish rugby union teams